WASP-48 is a subgiant star about 1400 light-years away. The star is likely older than Sun and slightly depleted in heavy elements. It shows an infrared excess noise of unknown origin, yet has no detectable ultraviolet emissions associated with the starspot activity. The discrepancy may be due to large interstellar absorption of light in interstellar medium for WASP-48. The measurements are compounded by the emission from eclipsing contact binary NSVS-3071474 projected on sky plane nearby, although no true stellar companions were detected by survey in 2015.

The star is rotating rapidly, being spun up by the tides raised by the giant planet on close orbit.

Planetary system
In 2011 a transiting hot Jupiter planet b was detected.

References

Cygnus (constellation)
G-type subgiants
Planetary systems with one confirmed planet
Planetary transit variables
J19243895+5528233